Verwertungsgesellschaft Wort (VG WORT, Collection Management Organisation VG WORT) is a Munich-based German copyright collective that administers copyright-related royalties. It was founded in February 1958 at the initiative of the Association of German Writers.  was one of the co-founders and later honorary president.

See also
GEMA
GÜFA

References

External links
Official homepage

Copyright collection societies
Organisations based in Munich
1958 establishments in West Germany